Samuel Preston is the name of:
 Samuel W. Preston (1840–1865), American naval officer
 Samuel Preston (mayor) (1665–1743), mayor of colonial Philadelphia
 Preston (singer) (born 1982), British pop performer
 Samuel H. Preston (born 1943), American sociologist
 Samuel Tolver Preston (1844–1917), English engineer and physicist